Abraham Mok (15 May 1888 – 29 February 1944) was a Dutch gymnast who competed in the 1908 Summer Olympics. He is remembered as one of four members of that squad murdered during the Holocaust of the 1940s.

Biography

Athletic career
Mok was part of the Dutch gymnastics team, which finished seventh in the team event at the 1908 Summer Olympics, held in London.

In the individual all-around competition Mok finished 78th.

Death and legacy
Mok, who had ethnic Jewish parents, was deported to the Auschwitz concentration camp located in Oświęcim, Małopolskie, Poland and murdered there on February 29, 1944. Mok was one of four members of the 1908 Dutch gymnastics team murdered in the Holocaust, sharing his fate with teammates Isidore Goudeket, Abraham de Oliviera, and Jonas Slier.

Footnotes

1888 births
1944 deaths
Dutch male artistic gymnasts
Gymnasts at the 1908 Summer Olympics
Olympic gymnasts of the Netherlands
Gymnasts from Amsterdam
Dutch civilians killed in World War II
Dutch people who died in Auschwitz concentration camp
Jewish gymnasts
Jewish Dutch sportspeople
Dutch Jews who died in the Holocaust